Chandra Prakash Gajurel "Prakash" (born 29 April 1948) is a Nepalese political activist who is a member of the Political Bureau of the Communist Party of Nepal (Maoist) (CPN-M).  His alias is "Comrade Gaurav".

The Unified Communist Party of Nepal (Maoist) (UCPN-M) split in June 2012 following the dissolution of the Constituent Assembly, and Gajurel joined the breakaway hardliner faction of Mohan Baidya "Kiran", the CPN-M.

See also
People's War in Nepal
Politics of Nepal
 List of communist parties in Nepal

References

External links
Interpol: Arrest Warrant for Chandra Prakash Gajurel
Nepal Police: Wanted Maoist leaders, including Gajurel
Royal Nepal Army: Wanted Maoist leaders, including Gajurel
 Deccan Herald: European team allowed to meet Nepal Maoist
 A World to Win: "Denounce the Crimes of the Indian Authorities! Defend Comrade Gaurav!"
 Interview with CP Gajurel in eKantipur:Nepal's Daily

1948 births
Living people
Communist Party of Nepal (Maoist Centre) politicians
Nepalese atheists
People of the Nepalese Civil War

Members of the 1st Nepalese Constituent Assembly